The Tanner scale (also known as the Tanner stages or sexual maturity rating (SMR)) is a scale of physical development as children transition into adolescence and then adulthood. The scale defines physical measurements of development based on external primary and secondary sex characteristics, such as the size of the breasts, genitals, testicular volume, and growth of pubic hair. This scale was first quantified in 1969 by James Tanner, a British pediatrician, after a two-decade-long study following the physical changes in girls undergoing puberty.

Due to natural variation, individuals pass through the Tanner stages at different rates, depending in particular on the timing of puberty. Among researchers who study puberty, the Tanner scale is commonly considered the "gold standard" for assessing pubertal status when it is conducted by a trained medical examiner. In HIV treatment, the Tanner scale is used to determine which regimen to follow for pediatric or adolescent patients on antiretroviral therapy (adult, adolescent, or pediatric guidelines). The Tanner scale has also been used in forensics to determine aging, but its usage has decreased due to lack of reliability.

Stages
Adapted from Adolescent Health Care: A Practical Guide by Lawrence Neinstein.

Genitals (male)

 Tanner I
 testicular volume less than 1.5 ml; small penis (prepubertal) 
 Tanner II
 testicular volume between 1.6 and 6 ml; skin on scrotum thins, reddens and enlarges; penis length unchanged 
 Tanner III
 testicular volume between 6 and 12 ml; scrotum enlarges further; penis begins to lengthen
 Tanner IV
 testicular volume between 12 and 20 ml; scrotum enlarges further and darkens; penis increases in length 
 Tanner V
 testicular volume greater than 20 ml; adult scrotum and penis

Breasts (female)

 Tanner  I
 no glandular tissue: areola follows the skin contours of the chest (prepubertal)
 Tanner II
 breast bud forms, with small area of surrounding glandular tissue; areola begins to widen 
 Tanner III
 breast begins to become more elevated, and extends beyond the borders of the areola, which continues to widen but remains in contour with surrounding breast
 Tanner IV
 increased breast sizing and elevation; areola and papilla form a secondary mound projecting from the contour of the surrounding breast
 Tanner V
 breast reaches final adult size; areola returns to contour of the surrounding breast, with a projecting central papilla

Pubic hair (both male and female)
 Tanner I
 no pubic hair at all (prepubertal)
 Tanner II
 small amount of long, downy hair with slight pigmentation at the base of the penis and scrotum (males) or on the labia majora (females) 
 Tanner III
 hair becomes more coarse and curly, and begins to extend laterally
 Tanner IV
 adult-like hair quality, extending across pubis but sparing medial thighs
 Tanner V
 hair extends to medial surface of the thighs

Height
During Tanner V, females stop growing and reach their adult height. Usually, this happens in their mid teens at 14 or 15 years for females. Males also stop growing and reach their adult height during Tanner V; usually this happens in their late teens at 16 to 17 years.

Tanner stage data in history
In 1970, white boys reached the last Tanner stage, the postpubertal stage, on average at the age of 14.9 years and girls around the age of 14 depending on social class and the particular study. In the nearly fifty years since those studies, the ages at which children are beginning puberty has only declined: "The age of puberty, especially female puberty, has been decreasing in western cultures for decades now ... for example, at the turn of the 20th century, the average age for an American girl to get her period was 16 or 17. Today, that number has decreased to 12 or 13 years."

Criticism
The scale has been criticized by the pornography industry for its potential to lead to false child pornography convictions, such as in the case of pornographic actress Lupe Fuentes where in 2009 United States federal authorities used it to assert that she was not an adult despite her age. Fuentes personally appeared at the trial and provided documentation that showed that the DVDs in question were legally produced.

Tanner, the author of the classification system, has argued that age classification using the stages of the scale misrepresents the intended use. Tanner stages do not match with chronological age, but rather maturity stages and thus are not diagnostic for age estimation.

See also
 Delayed puberty
 Gonadarche
 Pubarche
 Vellus
 Precocious puberty

References

External links

 The Male Tanner stages
 The Female Tanner stages
 
 

Medical scales
Endocrinology
Paraphilias
Pediatrics
Sexology
Sexuality and age
Puberty
1969 introductions